South Street is a closed station located along the Northeast Corridor in Newark, New Jersey. It served two lines of the Pennsylvania Railroad before closing. Construction on the station began in 1901, the original station had restrooms, a large waiting room, baggage facilities, a newsstand, and a telegraph office. The station replaced at-grade stations at Chestnut Street and Emmett Street.

Cancelled PATH proposal
A proposal to build a PATH station near the South Street station was abandoned. However, this was mixed up with the new station planned to be in the south ward, and politicians responded with anger to the Port Authority as a result. However, the Port Authority then revealed the misunderstanding, as well as the fact that the station was still being planned out, not cancelled.

References

Former railway stations in New Jersey
Transportation in Newark, New Jersey
Railway stations in Essex County, New Jersey
Former Pennsylvania Railroad stations
Railway stations in the United States opened in 1901
1901 establishments in New Jersey